Péter Várhelyi (born April 15, 1950) is a Hungarian sprint canoer who competed in the early to mid-1970s. He won three medals at the ICF Canoe Sprint World Championships with a gold (K-1 4 x 500 m: 1975) and two bronzes (K-4 1000 m: 1970, 1971).

Várhelyi also finished sixth in the K-4 1000 m event at the 1972 Summer Olympics in Munich.

References

Sports-Reference.com profile

1950 births
Canoeists at the 1972 Summer Olympics
Hungarian male canoeists
Living people
Olympic canoeists of Hungary
ICF Canoe Sprint World Championships medalists in kayak
20th-century Hungarian people